In Japanese history, the 1563 Siege of Musashi-Matsuyama was a successful attempt by a combined Takeda clan-Hōjō clan army to regain Musashi province and Matsuyama castle from the Uesugi clan; the Hōjō had seized the castle from the Uesugi in the first Siege of Musashi-Matsuyama (1537) but lost it, and in 1563 so sought to regain control of it once more.

Musashi-Matsuyama, situated in Japan's Musashi province (today Saitama prefecture), is so called simply to distinguish it from the other locations known as Matsuyama Castle throughout Japan. Retaken by the Uesugi, who held it originally before the Hōjō siege twenty-six years earlier, it came under siege from the Hōjō and Takeda very soon after it was regained. The besieging army, under the command of Takeda Shingen and Hōjō Ujiyasu, employed a team of miners to dig under the castle's defenses, allowing the greater portion of their force easier access to their target.

References
Turnbull, Stephen (1998). 'The Samurai Sourcebook'. London: Cassell & Co.

Musashi-Matsuyama 1563
Musashi-Matsuyama 1563
Musashi-Matsuyama
Conflicts in 1563